Elections to Waltham Forest Council were held in May 2002.  The whole council was up for election for the first time since the 1998 election. These elections were the first held on new ward boundaries which increased the total number of Councillors by 2, from 58 to 60.

Waltham Forest local elections are held every four years, with the next due in 2006.

Despite losing their majority, Labour were able to continue in administration, in a minority.

Composition before election

Election result

|}

References

2002
2002 London Borough council elections